The St. Johnsbury and Lamoille County Railroad (StJ&LC) was a railroad located in northern Vermont. It provided service to rural parts of the state for over a century, until track deterioration and flood damage made the line unusable and uneconomical to repair, which forced the line to close in 1995. Vermont is in the process of converting the roughly 96-mile route from St. Johnsbury to Swanton into a rail trail, known as the Lamoille Valley Rail Trail. Once completed it will be the longest rail trail in New England.

History 
The railroad began construction in December 1869 as part of the Vermont Division of the Portland and Ogdensburg Railway to connect the Great Lakes with the seaport of Portland, Maine. It would be completed on July 17, 1877 with Governor Horace Fairbanks driving in the silver spike in Fletcher. Although the railroad had plans on expansion to Lake Ontario, the line originally ended at Swanton. The Vermont Division was extended to Rouses Point in 1883, allowing it to connect to the Ogdensburg and Lake Champlain Railroad and provide a direct connection to the Great Lakes.

The eastern end of the Vermont Division was leased to the Maine Central Railroad in 1912, and the remainder of the line became a subsidiary of the Boston and Maine Railroad.  The Boston & Maine operated their segment as the St. Johnsbury and Lake Champlain Railroad after 1925.  This segment was reorganized as the St. Johnsbury and Lamoille County Railroad in 1948.

Freight traffic was 30% inbound commodities, 20% outbound dairy products to Boston, 15% outbound forest products, and 25% outbound limestone, talc and asbestos.  The remaining 10% was bridge line traffic (westbound paper and eastbound feed) for the Maine Central Railroad Mountain Division.  Six 70-ton General Electric Diesel locomotives replaced steam locomotives.  Passenger service ended in 1956.  Trucks had taken all of the milk traffic by 1961, but bridge line traffic had increased six-fold following the 1953 dissolution of Maine Central's joint operating agreement with Boston and Maine Railroad.  Light-duty rail and covered bridges prevented the line from accepting new heavier "incentive" freight car loadings.  The covered bridges were replaced or reinforced so worn out light diesel locomotives could be replaced by larger locomotives; but track conditions deteriorated under the heavier loads.

The State of Vermont purchased the line from Samuel Pinsly in 1973.  The line was then operated by Morrison-Knudsen as the Vermont Northern Railroad for a time. In 1978, local shippers took over the operation and it became the Lamoille Valley Railroad. In 1989, the line was leased to a Florida company and was operated by them until major flooding in 1995 and 1997 damaged the line so much that it was not profitable to repair the track. In 2002, the state of Vermont started converting the 96-mile route into a recreational trail and created the Lamoille Valley Rail Trail, under a railbanking arrangement.

Rail trail 
The State of Vermont created the Lamoille Valley Rail Trail Committee in 1997 to begin the conversion of the old route into a recreational trail. In 2002 the federal Surface Transportation Board allowed the decommissioning of the old right of way into a trail, with then representative Bernie Sanders earmarking over $5 million in federal funding for its construction. Work began in 2006, with work slowly progressing with funding availability and the labor-intensive rehabilitation of old stone supports and bridges. As of 2020 two disconnected sections have been constructed; one 15 miles long from downtown St. Johnsbury to Joe's Pond in West Danville , and the second 17 miles from Cambridge to Morrisville tracing the course of the Lamoille River.

Route and Station listing

Locomotives

References
 
 
 
 
https://vtvast.org/flipbook/LVRT/History/?page=1

Notes

Defunct Vermont railroads
Railway companies established in 1948
Railway companies disestablished in 1973
American companies established in 1948